Weather Star XL is the fifth generation of the WeatherStar systems used by the American cable and satellite television channel The Weather Channel (TWC), that are used to insert local forecasts and current weather information (such as the "Local on the 8s" segments within its program schedule) into TWC's programming. At its rollout in 1998, it came months after a major update to the channel's on-air presentation. The Star XL was a major leap over the much older Weather Star 4000 system, featuring advanced capabilities such as transitions, moving icons, cloud wallpaper backgrounds and reading the local forecast contents. The WeatherStar XL first appeared in a beta roll-out on select cable systems in November 1998 and appeared briefly on The Weather Channel Latin America until that channel's demise.

On June 26, 2014, The Weather Channel discontinued broadcasting its analog satellite feed, thus officially retiring all Weather Star units prior to the IntelliStar, including the XL. To address the need for a low-cost replacement, The Weather Channel developed in 2013 the IntelliStar 2 Jr. platform, which is capable of operating natively on both analog and digital cable systems.

Technical

The Weather Star XL is a rack-mounted rendering computer, manufactured by Silicon Graphics, Inc., containing a modified SGI O2 computer. The O2 is an entry-level Unix workstation introduced in 1996 by SGI to replace their earlier Indy series. Like the Indy, the O2 used a single MIPS microprocessor and was intended to be used mainly for multimedia purposes; the O2 was SGI's last attempt at a low-end workstation. The Weather Star XL utilizes the SGI IRIX Operating System with custom written software for The Weather Channel. Because of the proprietary SGI hardware and software, the Weather Star XL remains the most expensive STAR system, having a manufacturing cost of $US6,500. As a result of the XL's high price, many smaller cable headends retained their Weather Star 4000 or Weather Star Jr. units until the IntelliStar was released, skipping the XL altogether.

The Weather Star XL receives raw video data from The Weather Channel and weather statements from the National Weather Service, as well as forecasts from an Internet connection. It sends back monitoring data to The Weather Channel. Its crawl controller (which manages the text for local advertising) is accessible via a modem and terminal/terminal emulator. In Latin America, TWC only used satellite to deliver the service.

Timeline

See also
 The Weather Channel
 IntelliStar
 IntelliStar 2
 IntelliStar 2 Jr
 Weatherscan
 WeatherStar
 Weather Star Jr
 Weather Star 4000

References

External links
 The Weather Channel

Television technology
The Weather Channel
Silicon Graphics
1998 software
Products and services discontinued in 2014